Apisa fontainei is a moth of the family Erebidae. It was described by Sergius G. Kiriakoff in 1959. It is found in the Democratic Republic of the Congo, Kenya and Rwanda.

References

Moths described in 1959
Syntomini
Erebid moths of Africa